Wikirank may refer to:

 Wikirank.com, a defunct website that tracked the popularity of Wikipedia articles
 Wikirank.net, a similar website to Wikirank.com.